This is a list of famous Assyrian-Iranians.

Art
 Evin Agassi - singer
 Ashurbanipal Babilla (1944 Tehran - New York City) - actor, theatre director, playwright and visual artist
 Issa Benyamin (born 1924 Tabriz) - calligraphist
 Aril Brikha (born 1976 Tehran) - musician
 George Chaharbakhshi (born 1952 Tehran) - singer
 Henri Charr - film director
 William D. S. Daniel, author, poet, and musician
 Jack Douglas (1921 Kermanshah - 1994 Los Angeles) - television personality
 Andre Khabbazi (born 1975 Sacramento) - actor
 Paulus Khofri (1923 Baghdad-2000 Tehran) - composer and painter
 Terrence Malick (born 1943 Ottawa) - film director and producer
 Shamiram Urshan (1938 Tehran-2011 Los Angeles) - singer
 Marganita Vogt-Khofri (born 1952 Kermanshah) - musician

Literature
 John Batchelor (born 1948 Bryn Mawr) - journalist
 Ivan Kakovitch (1933 Kiev-2006 Paris) journalist and author
 Eden Naby (born 1942 Gulpashan) - historian
 Mikhael Pius (1927 Baghdad-2011 Modesto) - historian

Politics
 Freydun Atturaya (1891 Urmia-1926 Tbilisi) - physician and politician
 Yonathan Betkolia (born 1951 Urmia) - politician
 Eugene Dooman (1890 Osaka - 1969) - diplomat
 George Malek-Yonan - politician
 John Nimrod (1922 Chicago - 2009) - politician

Religion
 Aphrahat (3rd and 4th centuries) - Christian author
 Toma Audo (1854 Alqosh - 1918 Urmia) - Catholic archbishop
 Paul Bedjan (1838 Khosrowabad - 1920 Cologne) - Catholic priest and orientalist
 David Benjamin Keldani (1867 rmia-1940) - Catholic priest
 Yohannan Gabriel (1758 Khosrowabad - 1833 Khosrowabad) - Catholic bishop of Salmas
 Jacob David (1873 Sir - 1967 Chicago) pastor and relief worker
 Andrew David Urshan (1884 near Urmia - 1967 United States) - evangelist and author
 Ramzi Garmou (born 1945 Zakho) - Catholic Metropolitan Archbishop of Tehran
 Ishodad of Merv (9th century) - bishop
 Youhannan Semaan Issayi (1914 Sanandaj - 1999 Tehran) - Catholic Metropolitan Archbishop of Tehran
 Nicholas I Zaya (born Khosrowabad - died 1855 Khosrowabad) - Catholic Patriarch of Babylon

Sciences
 Bukhtishu family - famous medieval physicians
 Eprime Eshag (1918 Urmia-1998 Oxford) - economist
 Alexander George (1920 Chicago-2006 Seattle) - scholar in political sciences

Sports
 Alex Agase (1922 Chicago-2007 Tarpon Springs) - American football player
 Andre Agassi (born 1970 Las Vegas) - American tennis player
 Emmanuel Agassi (1930 Salmas - 2021 Las Vegas) - boxer
 Daniel Alaei (born 1983) - poker player
 Steven Beitashour (born 1987 San Jose) - football player
 Youra Eshaya (1933-1992 Sweden) - football player
 George Issabeg (born 1930) - boxer
 Benny Koochoie (born 1986)  - basketballer
 Jeff Moorad - baseball executive
 Shoura Osipov boxer
 Michael Shabaz (born 1987 Fairfax County) - tennis player
 Eskandar Shora - boxer
 Henrik Tamraz (1935 Urmia - 1996) - weightlifter
 Gela Youhanna - football player
 Edmond Yunanpour (born 1963 Ahvaz) - football manager and former player

Others
 Ramona Amiri (born 1980 Montreal) - Miss Canada 2005
 Milton Malek-Yonan (1904 Urmia-2002 Carmel) - entrepreneur and inventor
 Bob Miner (1941 Cicero-1994 San Francisco) - businessman
 Estiphan Panoussi (born 1935 Sanandaj) - philosopher and oriental philologist (Persian, Arabic and Neo-Aramaic)
 Juliana Taimoorazy (born 1973 in Tehran) - Assyrian activist and humanitarian

See also
 list of Iranians
 List of Iranian Arabs

References

Assyrians
Assyrians